Lyutitsa is one of the largest and best preserved castles in the easternmost part of the Eastern Rhodopes, located 3.5 hours' walk south-west of Ivaylovgrad, in southernmost Bulgaria. It is also known as the "Marble City" because its walls are made of white marble. 

The ruins of two churches have been excavated as well as a necropolis with 15 graves. Among the numerous archaeological finds are rare coins, ceramics from Preslav, jewelry and tools.

Honour
Lyutitsa Nunatak on Greenwich Island in the South Shetland Islands, Antarctica is named after Lyutitsa.

Gallery

References

External links
Lyutitsa at Journey.bg 
Photos from Lyutitsa 

Castles in Bulgaria
Buildings and structures in Haskovo Province
Rhodope Mountains